The Dacia Duster is a family of automobiles produced and marketed jointly by the French manufacturer Renault and its Romanian subsidiary Dacia since 2010. It is currently in its second generation, launched in the autumn of 2017. It is marketed as the Renault Duster in certain markets such as Latin America, Russia, Ukraine, Asia, the Middle East, South Africa, and New Zealand. The first generation was rebadged and restyled as the Nissan Terrano in CIS countries and India. It was introduced in March 2010, and is the third model of the Dacia brand based on the Logan platform, after the Sandero.

The four-door double cab pick-up was launched at the end of 2015 in South America, marketed as the Renault Duster Oroch, while the single cab Dacia Duster Pick-Up was introduced in 2020.



First generation (HS; 2010)

Design

The Duster was initially introduced in the ice racing version prepared for the Andros Trophy, presented for the first time on 17 November 2009. The production version was revealed to the media on 8 December 2009, and was subsequently launched at the Geneva Motor Show in March 2010.

Based on the B0 platform, the Duster measures  in length,  in width and has  of ground clearance.

The first-generation Duster was offered with two-wheel drive or four-wheel-drive. The 4x4 variants make use of Nissan's all-wheel drive system, which allows the driver to choose from three different driving modes: Auto, in which the rear-wheel drive is engaged automatically in case the front wheels lose grip, Lock, whereby 50 per cent of torque is consistently fed through the rear axle, and 2WD where the transmission is locked into front-wheel drive for maximum fuel efficiency.

The Renault 4 had some influence on the Duster's design.

Facelift

In September 2013, the facelifted Dacia Duster was presented at the Frankfurt Motor Show. The exterior received important changes in the front with a new chromed grille and redesigned headlights, restyled roof bars, new 16-inch wheels and modest modifications in the rear. The interior was also renewed, with design and features similar to those introduced the previous year on the new models in the Dacia line-up. A new TCe 125 1.2 liter direct-injection turbo engine was introduced.

In 2016, the Duster received a new steering wheel and a Blackshadow trim.

Safety

The Dacia Duster features Bosch 8.1 ABS, as well as electronic brakeforce distribution (EBD) and emergency brake assist (EBA). It also features electronic stability control (ESC) as an option on certain versions, as well as understeer control (CSV) and traction control (ASR). This option also allows torque to be transferred away from a spinning wheel in 4x4 mode to improve traction when diagonal wheel spin occurs.

On the passive safety front, the Dacia Duster comes as standard with two front airbags (depending on market) and three-point seat belts with load limiters for the front seats. Depending on version, two lateral head/thorax airbags are fitted in addition to the driver and passenger front airbags to provide additional protection in the case of side impact. The pyrotechnic pretensioners for the front seats (depending on version) complete Dacia Duster's retention system.

The Duster for India with no airbags and no ABS received 0 stars for adult occupants and 2 stars for toddlers from Global NCAP in 2017.

The Duster for India with driver airbag and no ABS received 3 stars for adult occupants and 2 stars for toddlers from Global NCAP in 2017 (similar to Latin NCAP 2013).

The Duster in its most basic Latin American configuration with 1 airbag and no ABS received 4 stars for adult occupants and 2 stars for toddlers from Latin NCAP in 2015.

In 2011, the Duster was tested by the Euro NCAP, receiving a three-star rating. It was awarded 27 points (74%) for the adult occupant protection, 38 points (78%) for the child occupant protection, 10 points (28%) for the pedestrian protection and two points (29%) for the safety assist features. In the latter category, the rating was influenced by the lack of the speed limiter and the fact that the electronic stability control was available only as an option.

Engines

Marketing and production

The first-generation Dacia Duster was offered in Europe, Turkey, Algeria and Morocco from March 2010, with prices starting from €11,900 (or €10,500 in Romanian domestic market) for the two-wheel drive version, and from €13,900 (or €11,500 in Romanian domestic market) for the 4x4 version. From June 2010, the Duster is also available in Ukraine, Jordan, Syria, Egypt and Lebanon and in some African countries badged as a Renault, while in 2011, it is sold in the Persian Gulf States.

In 2014, 40% of the Duster units sold worldwide were badged as Dacia and 60% (70% in 2013) as Renault.

In June 2011, Renault revealed the Duster in South America at the Buenos Aires Motor Show. It will be produced at its Curitiba plant in Brazil for distribution in Brazil, Argentina, and Chile, and at the Sofasa plant in Colombia, to be sold in Mexico and Ecuador with marketing planned to start in the last quarter of 2011.

The first-generation Duster was manufactured at the Avtoframos plant in Moscow, Russia with about  annual quantities, being available since 1 March 2012 with prices starting from about $14,400 and reaching  sales in 2.5 years. In June 2015, an updated version of the Duster was launched in Russia with some improved engines and features.

The Dacia brand was launched in 2012 in the UK. The Duster was named "Scottish Car of the year", "SUV of the year" and "Budget car of the year" by the Association of Scottish Motoring Writers. In 2012, the Duster was also introduced in Ireland.

Since 2011, the flexi-fuel (ethanol) version was available in several Western European countries, while the Bi-Fuel (LPG) version, an OEM Landi Renzo, was offered in Eastern Europe, Italy, Germany, Poland, Spain and the Netherlands. As of January 2013, the Bi-Fuel version was also available in France. The Bi-Fuel (LPG) version has proved to be very popular in Poland. Since the Duster's K4M engine has hydraulic lifters, the LPG version needs no regular valve adjustments. As of 2014, the United Kingdom, Ireland, Belgium, Romania and Luxembourg are the only countries in the European Union where the LPG version was not offered by Dacia.

UK
The Dacia Duster was launched in the UK in 2012, and has received several awards since, including: 2012 Top Gear Bargain of the Year, 2012 Scottish Car of the Year, and 2014 Carbuyer.co.uk Best Small SUV.

The Duster was Dacia's best selling vehicle in the UK, with 20,000 sales as of 2016, from the 70,000 total Dacia sales in the same period.

Russia
The Duster was introduced in Russia in 2012, as Renault Duster. Its off-road capabilities for the relatively modest price have made Duster very popular. Initial strong demand has caused preorder waiting times of up to 18 months. In the first half of 2013, Renault Duster sold 40710 units, making it the 4th best-selling car model in Russia overall. The Duster was adapted to the Russian consumers expectations with for example the Renault Start innovative system of remote engine start, useful during the cold days to heat the car's body and engine, which decreases polluting emissions. In June 2015, a renewed version of the Duster was launched in Russia with a new range of more powerful and low-consumption engines, an automatic gearbox, some new options, new interior ergonomics and materials of interior trim, and a new exterior design.

India
Renault launched the Duster on 4 July 2012 in India, with various modifications for the Indian market. The suspension and the underside of the car were strengthened to increase the car's offroading suitability. Renault India also launched the all-wheel drive (AWD) version of Duster in 2014. The all-wheel drive feature of the SUV, can be controlled via a toggle switch, that has three options to choose from – two-wheel drive, automatic, and four-wheel drive which can be manually locked. The AWD version was discontinued in 2020.

In 2018, the vehicle contains 98 percent Indian parts.

In April 2019, Renault India had confirmed that the second generation Renault Duster will not be coming to India, which meant the first-generation Duster production was extended up until the third generation Duster launch scheduled for 2023. Renault India launched a second facelift for the car, featuring an updated bumper and grille design that slightly mimics the second generation Duster, including a hood cutout to accommodate the Renault logo, reflecting Renault's design language. It was offered with a 1.5 L K9K diesel engine until April 2020, when it was discontinued due to the implementation of Bharat Stage 6 emission standards. Renault ended production of the Duster in February 2022.

South Africa
Renault introduced the Duster in South Africa in October 2013. The Duster was originally imported from India, where it was also produced under the Dacia brand for other right-hand drive markets, namely the United Kingdom, Ireland, Cyprus and Malta. In September 2015, South Africa received the facelifted version of the Duster, with cars being imported from Romania.

Colombia
It was introduced in 2012 as the Renault Duster, and has been the best selling SUV in the country since then. It was assembled in the plant of SOFASA in Envigado, in four versions:

 1.6 Expression: It equips driver's airbag and front electric windows. It is powered by a 1.6 16 valve, 110 PS engine. Also equips a 5-speed manual gearbox.
 2.0 Dynamique: It equips two frontal airbags, rear electric windows, ABS, foglights, leather wheel, electric mirrors and a 6-speed manual gearbox. Also includes GPS system and leather seats as optional.
 2.0 AT: It has the same equipment as the Dynamique version. Equipes a 4-speed automatic gearbox.
 2.0 Dynamique 4X4: It is equipped the same as the Dynamique version, but includes 4WD system and black background headlights.

The Duster was exported from Colombia mostly to countries as Mexico, Ecuador and Bolivia. All versions are powered by a 16 valve, petrol engine. Also, since May 2014 it includes Media Nav system with GPS in Dynamique versions as optional.

The production of this generation in Colombia stopped in 2021.

Romania
In October 2015, a special edition called "Dacia Duster Connected by Orange" was released, featuring a Wi-Fi hotspot with a two-year free contract from the mobile operator Orange, a rear-view camera, a new brown paint color, a new version of 16-inch rims and electric-heated front seats.

Renault Duster Oroch

The Renault Duster Oroch is a double cab pick-up version of the Duster. The Duster Oroch is the first Renault-badged pick-up and creates a new range in the pick-up market: 30 cm larger than the small ones and smaller than the large pick-up, but yet with 4 real doors instead of 2 or 3 for the usual smaller pick-up. It was unveiled on 18 June 2015 at the Buenos Aires Motor Show and was previewed by a concept car at the 2014 São Paulo Motor Show.

The Duster Oroch is available since September 2015 in South America and will get an automatic gearbox in 2016. It is powered by either the 1.6 litre or the 2.0 litre petrol engine, mated to 5-speed or 6-speed gearbox respectively.

Nissan Terrano 
The Duster is also restyled and sold as the Nissan Terrano in CIS markets and India. The nameplate was used before as an alternative name to the Nissan Pathfinder. It is succeeded by the B0 platform-based Nissan Kicks in India.

Travec Tecdrah TTi
The Travec Tecdrah TTi is an off-road vehicle based on the first gen Dacia Duster, launched in 2011. which utilizes an APAL (of Russia) developed plastic body-on-space frame first used on the APAL Stalker.

Reception
British motoring journalist Jonny Smith took the Duster on a road test in Morocco for the Fifth Gear TV programme, describing it as "brilliant"; "I really like this". He particularly praised its handling on poorly maintained mountain roads, while commenting on its poor standard of finish. Another drive test in Morocco was performed by James May for the Top Gear magazine.

The Dacia Duster was awarded the "Autobest 2011" prize by the members of the Autobest jury, coming from fifteen countries (Bulgaria, Croatia, Czech Republic, Cyprus, Macedonia, Hungary, Poland, Romania, Russia, Serbia, Slovakia, Slovenia, Turkey, Ukraine and Malta). Ten members of the jury have designated the Duster as the winner, after scoring in 13 criteria such as fuel consumption, versatility, roominess or design. It outran the Renault Fluence, placed third.

The Dacia Duster was nominated among the finalists of the "2011 European Car of the Year" award. It received praise for being "a real bargain", "a competent off-roader", as well as "attractive" and "practical".

The Dacia Duster was named the "Scottish Car of the Year 2012" at a ceremony held in Glasgow on 14 October 2012. It was also named "The Bargain of the Year 2012" by the Top Gear magazine.

In India, the Renault Duster received the "2013 Indian Car of the Year" award from a jury comprising leading automotive magazines of the country.

Second generation (HM; 2017)

A second generation was announced between 14 and 24 September 2017 during the Frankfurt Motor Show with the production models reaching the Romanian market in November 2017. The new model has nearly the same dimensions, and built on the same B0 platform as the first generation. Although it is near-identical in terms of dimensions, according to Renault design chief, Laurens van den Acker, every body panel is new. The interior design has been revamped and the interior noise has been reduced to half of the previous generation. It has a nearly the same boot volume of 445 litres on two-wheel-drive versions, or 376 litres on four-wheel-drive versions, and a total dedicated storage space of 28.6 litres. A facelifted version was unveiled in 2021.

It now features an electric power steering, a MultiView camera system consisting of four cameras, blind spot warning system, automatic climate control, keyless entry and ignition system, and daytime running lights. The ground clearance has been increased and a hill-start assist system is also offered, as well as hill descent control. The top trim level features 17 inch wheels. The mid-range Comfort model offers as standard Bluetooth, air conditioning, SatNav, rear parking sensors, rear camera, cruise control, six speed gearbox, alloy wheels, sports front seats.

It retains tweaked versions of the same 1.5-litre diesel, and 1.6-litre and 1.2-litre petrol engines as the outgoing model. The diesel can be mated to a dual-clutch automatic transmission (EDC). GCC markets and several Latin American markets continue to offer a 2.0-litre petrol engine as the main option; this engine is not available in Europe where it does not suit CO2, emissions, and fuel consumption requirements.

In 2018, Renault first rolled out across its Dacia range its new modified Euro 6 compliant 1.5-litre common-rail turbodiesel engine. To keep its NOx emissions low, this engine requires the injection of AdBlue fluid into the exhaust system.

Safety

In December 2017, Euro NCAP has published the results for the crash-tests of the second generation model. It received three out of five stars, the result being considered an expected one, although most of its rivals received five stars. It was awarded 27 points (71%) for the adult occupant protection, 32 points (66%) for the child occupant protection, 24 points (56%) for the pedestrian protection and five points (37%) for the safety assist features.

In the frontal offset test, the driver received marginal to good protection ratings, while the passenger occupant received adequate to good ratings. In the frontal full width test, the driver's head received a poor protection rating and an adequate to good rating for the rest of the body.

Pedestrian protection was "predominantly good or adequate but poor results were recorded along the base of the windscreen and along the stiff windscreen pillars. The bumper provided good protection to pedestrians' legs and protection of the pelvis was also good at all test locations."

In terms of safety equipment, it was downrated because of the lack of knee airbags, rear side chest airbags, side pelvis airbags, automatic emergency braking system or lane assist system, but it received points for the availability of the speed limiter and the seat belt reminder.

Latin America 

The Latin American Duster has front disc brakes.

The Duster in its most basic Latin American configuration with 2 airbags and ESC received 4 stars for adult occupants and 3 stars for toddlers from Latin NCAP in 2019.

Latin NCAP did a crash test of the 2021 Renault Duster manufactured in Brazil and Colombia, in its most basic Latin American configuration with 2 airbags, airbag switch, and ESC obtaining 0 stars in the crash tests (one level above 2019, similar to Euro NCAP 2014), during the tests the passenger side door was opened and the car had a fuel leak. that made the Latin NCAP call for attention to Renault to recall the cars sold and prevent the car from leaking fuel during an accident.

Duster Eco-G 
In January 2020, Dacia presented the Duster Eco-G at the Brussels Motor Show equipped with the 3-cylinder 1.0 TCe 100 hp running on LPG.

Duster Pick-Up 
In October 2020, Dacia introduced the single cab pick-up version based on the four-wheel drive Duster model.

Duster Fiskal
In 2018, Dacia's Austrian importer developed a panel van version of the second generation Duster called the Dacia Duster Fiskal. This has a flat metal loading floor, a metal cargo divider, and blanked rear side windows. The rear side doors still opened, although the Duster Fiskal is a strict two-seater. The Austrian importer had also offered a Fiskal version of the original Duster.

Reception
British website carwow has reviewed the car in July 2018. It was criticised for the poor range of equipment in the lowest trim level, considering its price, for its plasticky, dark-coloured and "cheap-feeling" interior, the lack of light for the vanity mirror or the noisy electric motor for the windows. Among the good points there are its accessible folding seats, the rear-view and panoramic cameras, the in-depth-adjustable steering wheel, the good visibility and handling inside town, the soft suspension and the lock mode for the four-wheel-drive.

Facelift

The restyled version of the Duster is presented on June 22, 2021 and went on sale in September 2021. The updated Duster is equipped with a new light signature, both front and rear, similar to the third-generation Sandero. The pattern of the grille is slightly simplified and a sliding central armrest is inside.

The number of engines available is reduced, with now two petrol engines of 130 and 150hp, a petrol/LPG version of 100hp, and a 115hp diesel engine available in all-wheel drive. The most powerful engine is now available as standard with the 6-speed automatic transmission (EDC6).

2022 refresh

In June 2022, like the entire Dacia range, the Duster received a slight update featuring the brand's new logo. The grille was redesigned, the steering wheel was updated with the new logo, and all the other badges were replaced. On some versions, the air vents were also updated to the same as the Renault Duster.  The facelift also applied to the Commercial version, sold only in the United Kingdom.

Duster Pick-up
The Dacia Duster Pick-up facelift, manufactured by Romturingia and approved by the brand, is available in France from November 2022 from the specialist Borel.

Special editions

Techroad

Dacia presented the special edition in March 2019 at the Geneva Motor Show, being launched under the names Charisma or Ultimate in some markets, and in Romania it was known as Techroad.

Black Collector
Launched in September 2019, the Dacia Duster Black Collector Edition was an exclusive version for France, sold exclusively online.

SE Twenty
In January 2020, Dacia celebrated two decades of Renault ownership by launching the SE Twenty special edition for the Sandero Stepway, Logan MCV Stepway and Duster.

Duster Extreme
Unveiled in August 2021, the Dacia Duster Extreme is a limited edition, with prices starting at 21,900 euros, which was launched in January 2022.

It was discontinued after the June 2022 update, but was brought back in October of that year.

Duster “Mat Edition”

A new special edition called the "Mat Edition" was presented at the 2022 Paris Motor Show, with orders open from the beginning of 2023. The model is distinguished by a special matte gray body color and is equipped as standard with all available options. It is powered by the 1.3-litre TCe 150 petrol engine producing , mated to an EDC automatic gearbox.

Motorsport

A competition version of the Duster, fitted with a  V6 petrol engine and driven by Alain Prost, took part in the 2009–2010 edition of the French ice racing championship Andros Trophy, finishing in second place at the end of the season.

In 2010, the Duster participated in the Rallye Aicha des Gazelles, being first in the crossover class. The two Dacia teams successfully finished the Rallye on board the Duster: Dounia and Isabelle (Team 315 - Dacia) were first in the general ranking, while Nathalie and Dorothée (Team 316 - Dacia) finished in 5th place (out of 8 teams competing in the class).

In 2011, Dacia announced that they would be racing the Duster in the "Unlimited Class" of the Pikes Peak International Hill Climb. The Dacia Duster 'No Limit' was powered by an 850 bhp version of the VR38DETT engine, used in the Nissan GT-R, mated to a six-speed sequential transmission. The car was tuned by Tork Engineering, Sodemo and Renault Sport and was driven by three-time Trophée Andros winner Jean-Phillipe Dayraut.

In 2013, two Renault Duster prototypes took part in the Dakar Rally, which took place in Peru, Argentina and Chile.

For the 2015 and 2016 editions of the Dakar Rally the Renault Dusters were significantly changed and now feature a Nissan VK50VE V8 engine, SADEV gearbox, Reiger shock absorbers and Powerbrake 6-piston calipers.

Dakar results

Concept cars

Renault Design Central Europe presented a concept car named Dacia Duster at the 2009 Geneva Motor Show. This concept vehicle was a 5-door SUV with rear suicide doors for easy access, that addressed the needs of families, with a roomy cabin in a compact package and a large  trunk. The Dacia Duster was the first concept car developed by Dacia, in collaboration with the Renault Design Technocentre. The Duster normally has four seats but can be converted into a two-seat car, the passenger seat slides under the driver's seat and the right back seat slides under the left back seat freeing an extra room of  ideal for a bicycle.

It was a front-engine, two-wheel-drive or four-wheel-drive vehicle, based on the Nissan B platform. If the model had been produced, its initial price would have been around 15,000 euro (US$18,750).

At the 2012 São Paulo Motor Show, Renault presented the DCross Concept, based on the production version of the Renault Duster. It was designed by Renault Design América Latina and was meant to "underline the robustness and all-terrains capability of the Duster". It featured a bright green and matte black paint scheme, a raised ride height, roof racks and a spare tire atop, but no other details were given.

Romania has demonstrated a combat version of the Duster, complete with armoring, a winch, and roof-mounted machine gun.

In October 2014, a double cab pick-up show car called Duster Oroch was presented by Renault at the São Paulo Motor Show. The concept car takes design clues from the DCross Concept, revealed at the previous edition of the event.

Former use of the name
Dacia Duster was also the name used to sell the ARO 10 on some markets, such as the United Kingdom, during the 1980s and early 1990s. It was offered in soft-top roadster and 2-door estate variants.

Sales

References

External links

Official Dacia Duster website

Duster
Duster
Concept cars
Cars of Romania
Compact sport utility vehicles
Crossover sport utility vehicles
Pickup trucks
Euro NCAP small off-road
Global NCAP small off-road
Latin NCAP small off-road
Front-wheel-drive vehicles
All-wheel-drive vehicles
2010s cars
Cars introduced in 2010
Vehicles with CVT transmission